Shahrvand Sari Futsal Club (Bashgah-e Futsal-e Shihervând Sari) is an Iranian professional futsal club based in Sari.

History 

The club was originally known as Shahrvand Sari, since the 2004/05 season. In the season of 2004/05 Super League it was renamed Rah Sari due to change of sponsorship. At 2014/15 Super League season Shahrvand Sari come back to maine name. Maine reason to come back this name is finance problem.

2011–12 
Rah sari, in this season placed 13th in table and Relegatian to the 1st Division. But by the increasing of the number of teams, futsal committee decided to stay at the Super league.

2014–15 
Rah sari, in 2013–14 Iranian Futsal Super League placed 14th in table and Relegatian to the 1st Division. But by took over the licence of Zam Zam Isfahan FSC in 2014–15 Iranian Futsal Super League.

Crest

Season to season

The table below chronicles the achievements of the Club in various competitions.

Last updated: August 20, 2021

Notes:
* unofficial titles
1 worst title in history of club

Key

P   = Played
W   = Games won
D   = Games drawn
L   = Games lost

GF  = Goals for
GA  = Goals against
Pts = Points
Pos = Final position

Honours

Individual 
 Top Goalscorer
 2003–04 Iranian Futsal Super League
  Mahmoud Lotfi (36 goals)
 2008–09 Iranian Futsal Super League
  Morteza Azimaei (31 goals)
 Best Young Player
 2013–14 Iranian Futsal Super League
  Mohammad Reza Kord

Players

Current squad

Notable players

Personnel

Current technical staff

Last updated: 17 January 2022

References

External links 
 

Futsal clubs in Iran
Sport in Sari, Iran
1994 establishments in Iran
Futsal clubs established in 1994